Barr station (French: Gare de Barr) is a railway station serving the commune of Barr, Bas-Rhin department, France. It is located on the Sélestat to Saverne railway. The station is owned and operated by SNCF, in the TER Grand Est regional rail network and is served by TER trains.

History 
The train station was opened by the Compagnie des chemins de fer de l'Est on 28 September 1864.

The old passenger building, which was built in 1877, is currently used by a billiards club.

Services 
Barr is a SNCF passenger stop on the TER Grand Est network. It is served by TER trains operating along the  Strasbourg - Molsheim - Barr - Sélestat route (A07).

See also 
 List of SNCF stations in Grand Est

References 

Railway stations in Bas-Rhin
Railway stations in France opened in 1864